= Fractal catalytic model =

A fractal catalytic model is a mathematical representation of chemical catalysis in an environment with fractal properties.
